Beidagang Reservoir is a large reservoir in southern Tianjin built between 1974 and 1980. It is the only large reservoir on the route of the Yellow River-Tianjin water transfer project. It serves as the water supply reservoir to the downtown of Tianjin and surrounding industrial and agricultural areas. The wetland around the reservoir is registered as a protected wetland of China.

References

Reservoirs in China